SX-10 is an American alternative metal band formed in 1996 by rapper Sen Dog.

History
SX-10 was formed in 1996 in Los Angeles, California by Cypress Hill member Sen Dog. According to Sen Dog, SX-10 was formed because he had wanted to perform a different style of music. SX-10 released its debut album, Mad Dog American, on June 6, 2000. It featured guest appearances by DJ Muggs, Everlast, Mellow Man Ace, Eric Bobo and Kottonmouth Kings.  Members Andy Zambrano and Jeremy Fleener also performed on Cypress Hill's 2001 album Stoned Raiders. In 2006, Sen Dog stated that SX-10 would be working on a second album.

Band members
 Sen Dog — vocals
 Jimmie Rodriguez — bass
 Andy Zambrano — guitar
 Jeremy Fleener — guitar
 Sean McCormick — drums

Discography
 Mad Dog American (2000)
 Temple Of Tolerance (Unreleased) (2006)
 EP (2008)

References

External links
 SX-10 on Myspace
 

Musical groups established in 1996
Rap metal musical groups
Rap rock groups